"Spaceship" is the first single by the post-grunge band Puddle of Mudd from their album Volume 4: Songs in the Key of Love & Hate. The music video premiered on Yahoo Music on November 16, 2009. As of August 2010, "Spaceship" has shifted 118,000 copies in the United States.

Music video
The video directed by Petro (The Academy Is, Rufus Wanwright) channels the best in space travel with alien strippers and an homage to Star Wars and its scrolling text intro. Rounding out the rockstar antics are the daredevils of Nitro Circus, including Travis Pastrana on his signature dirtbike.

Song reference
Some people consider the song to be inspired by the Douglas Adams character, Zaphod Beeblebrox.

Charts

Weekly charts

Year-end charts

References

External links

Puddle of Mudd songs
2009 singles
2009 songs
Songs written by Wes Scantlin
Geffen Records singles